Kivertsi is a town in Volyn Oblast, Ukraine. It is the administrative center of Kivertsi urban hromada. Area in total - 848,200 ha. Population: 

Kivertsi is located in Ukraine and time zone Europe/Kyiv, 12 km northeast from the city of Lutsk, the regional center.

The town has 3 artificial reservoirs (lake Molodizhne, with the area of 1.25 hectares, and two little lakes with an area of 1 ha each), the Prudnik River is passing through. 
On all sides the town is surrounded by forests. Within the city Kivertsi there is 171.7 hectares of forested land.

The Emblem

The Emblem of Kivertsi - a square divided horizontally into two parts. On the upper side of the white part there's a running red squirrel, the lower side is divided into three vertical stripes of equal width - green, yellow and green.

Origin of the name

The name ”Kivertsi” historians associate with the name of an ancient tribe called ”Tivertsi” that lived on the banks of the Dniester River at the mouth of the Danube.  At the end of the 11th and the beginning of the 12th century under the pressure of neighbour nomadic tribes Tivertsi moved north. Divided into smaller groups the tribe has spread and settled in Volyn. Over time, the name mutated into ”Kivertsi” and was assigned to the place of settlement of the tribe.

History

Kivertsi is a relatively young city, it is a little more than 130 years. Although the first settlements in this area appeared much earlier, as evidenced by the treasure of Roman coins from II-III BC, found here in 1700.

Kivertsi town owes its appearance on the map to the development of railway construction, which intensified after the abolition of serfdom in Russia in 1861.

In the 1870-1873 between the cities of Rivne and Kovel a railway track was laid, and 7 km from the village Kivertsi (now Prylutske) was built a station with the same name. In 1890, the War Department of the Russian Empire paved the railroad through Kivertsi to Lutsk, and then - to Lviv and Radehov, a border state with Austria-Hungary at that time. The town became an important railway junction.

In March 1918 residents strongly opposed the Austro-Hungarian occupation. In May 1919 Kivertsi was captured by the Poles. In July 1920 the city was occupied by the Red Army but according to the Riga Treaty of 1921 the settlement became a part of Poland. 

In September 1939 Kivertsi was incorporated by the Ukrainian Soviet Socialist Republic. In July 1941 German troops captured Kivertsi. In February 1944 Kivertsi was liberated from the German invaders.

A local newspaper is published here since January 1945.

Town since June 1951

In January 1989 the population was 16 722 people.

Numerous institutions of trade, public catering, consumer services, Kivertsi's city stadium, park, playground with artificial turf play significant role in Kivertsi's infrastructure.

Interesting events and celebrations taking place in Kivertsi

 Independence Day - 24 August
 National Flag Day - 23 August
 Day of Kivertsi - 9 September 
 Youth Day - the last Sunday of May 
 International Children's Day - 1 June
 Victory Day - 9 May
 Holodomor(The Great Famine) Remembrance Day - November 28 
 "Farewell winter, spring meeting"

References

External links
 Official website of Kivertsi's District Administration
 Official website of Kivertsi's City Council
 Unofficial website of Kivertsi 
 Community website of Kivertsi

Cities in Volyn Oblast
Cities of district significance in Ukraine
Populated places established in the Russian Empire